HNLMS Borneo was a unique schroefstoomschip 4e klasse (gunboat) of the Royal Netherlands Navy built by J&G Thomson in Clydebank Glasgow.

Description
The main armaments of the ship were six  guns and one  gun. The ship had a complement of 102 men.

Service history
Borneo was laid down in 1892 at the shipyard of J&G Thomson in Clydebank Glasgow and launched 24 November 1892. She began service in the Dutch East Indies in 1894.

On 11 September 1905 the ship took part in an expeditions to South Celebes. The ships where engaged in operations against the lord of Loewoe. An infantry battalion and a marine landing party were set ashore near Palope and later that day the soldiers and marines took the lord's palace.

From 1906 and onward she served as a survey vessel.

Notes

References
Koloniaal verslag van 1898 (Bijlage C 5.4)

1892 ships
Ships built on the River Clyde
19th-century naval ships of the Netherlands
Patrol vessels of the Royal Netherlands Navy
Survey ships